This is a list of South Korean radio stations. these stations can be heard on free-to-air terrestrial radio (which requires an outdoor antenna to receive FM radio clearly since radio stations in Seoul are broadcast nationwide via propagation broadcast.) or via the internet via the station's websites or PC apps.

Korean Broadcasting System

KBS 1Radio 
 Seoul (HLKA): FM 97.3 MHz, AM 711 kHz
 Chuncheon (HLKM) : FM 99.5 MHz, AM 657 kHz
 Wonju (HLCW) : FM 97.1 MHz, AM 1152 kHz
 Gangneung (HLKR) : FM 98.9 MHz, AM 864 kHz
 Daejeon (HLKI) : FM 94.7 MHz, AM 882 kHz
 Cheongju (HLKQ) : FM 89.3 MHz, AM 1062 kHz
 Chungju (HLCH) : FM 92.1 MHz
 Jeonju (HLKF) : FM 96.9 MHz, AM 567 kHz
 Gwangju (HLKH) : FM 90.5 MHz, AM 747 kHz
 Mokpo (HLKN) : FM 105.9Mhz, AM 1467 kHz
 Suncheon (HLCY) : FM 95.7 MHz, AM 630 kHz
 Daegu (HLKG) : FM 101.3, AM 738 kHz
 Andong (HLCR) : FM 90.5 MHz, AM 963 kHz
 Pohang (HLCP) : FM 95.9 MHz, AM 1035 kHz
 Busan (HLKB) : FM 103.7 MHz, AM 891 kHz
 Ulsan (HLQB) : FM 90.7 MHz, AM 1449 kHz 
 Changwon (HLAI) : FM 91.7 MHz 
 Jinju (HLCJ) : FM 90.3 MHz, AM 1098 kHz
 Jeju (HLKS) : FM 99.1 MHz, AM 963 kHz

KBS 2Radio 
 Seoul (HLSA-FM): FM 106.1 MHz (South Korea's most powerful FM radio station at 25 kW.)
 Chuncheon (HLCE-FM) : FM 98.7 MHz
 Wonju (HLCE-FM/relay) : FM 100.5 MHz
 Gangneung (HLAH-FM) : FM 102.1 MHz
 Daejeon (HLQT-FM) : FM 100.9 MHz
 Boryeong (HLQT-FM/relay) : FM 89.5 MHz
 Cheongju (HLAC-FM) : FM 90.9 MHz
 Jeonju (HLAS-FM) : FM 92.9 MHz
 Gwangju (HLAA-FM) : FM 95.5 MHz
 Mokpo : FM 88.1 MHz
 Daegu (HLQH-AM/HLQH-FM) : FM 102.3 MHz, AM 558 kHz
 Gimcheon (HLQH-FM/relay) : FM 88.9 MHz
 Busan (HLKE-FM) : FM 97.1 MHz
 Changwon (HLKD-FM) : FM 106.1 MHz
 Suncheon (HLKZ-FM) : FM 102.7 MHz
 Jeju (HLKS-FM) : FM 91.9, FM 89.7, FM 92.7 MHz

Note : KBS Local 2Radio carries KBS 2Radio at 07:00–11:00, 14:00–18:00, and 20:00–05:00 the next day KST and KBS 2FM at 05:00–07:00, 11:00–14:00 and 18:00–20:00 KST.

KBS 3Radio 
 Seoul (HLKC): FM 104.9 MHz, AM 1134 kHz
 Gangneung (HLCS-AM) : AM 1008 kHz
 Gwangju (HLAA-AM) : AM 1224 kHz
 Changwon (HLKD-AM) : AM 936 kHz
 Jeonju (HLAS-AM) : AM 675 kHz
 Suncheon (HLKZ-AM) : AM 576 kHz

KBS 1FM 
 Seoul (HLKA-FM): FM 93.1 MHz
 Chuncheon (HLKM-FM) : FM 91.1 MHz
 Wonju (HLCW-FM) : FM 89.5 MHz
 Gangneung (HLKR-FM) : FM 89.1 MHz
 Taebaek (HLSJ-FM/relay) : FM 96.3 MHz
 Daejeon (HLKI-FM) : FM 98.5 MHz
 Cheongju (HLKQ-FM) : FM 94.1 MHz
 Daejeon, Okcheon (relay) FM 102.1 MHz
 Chungju (HLCH-FM) : FM 100.3 MHz
 Jeonju (HLKF-FM) : FM 100.7 MHz
 Namwon (HLKL-FM/relay) : FM 104.5 MHz
 Gwangju (HLKH-FM) : FM 92.3 MHz
 Mokpo (HLKN-FM) : FM 98.3 MHz
 Suncheon (HLCY-FM) : FM 94.5 MHz
 Daegu (HLKG-FM) : FM 89.7 MHz
 Andong (HLCR-FM) : FM 88.1 MHz
 Pohang (HLCP-FM) : FM 93.5 MHz
 Busan (HLKB-FM) : FM 92.7 MHz
 Ulsan (HLQB-FM) : FM 101.9 MHz
 Changwon (HLAI-FM) : FM 93.9 MHz
 Jinju (HLCJ-FM) : FM 89.3 MHz
 Geochang (HLKW-FM/relay) : FM 92.1 MHz
 Jeju (HLCF-FM) : FM 96.3 MHz
 Seogwipo (HLCF-FM) : FM 99.9 MHz

KBS 2FM

FM Radio 
 Seoul (HLKC-FM): FM 89.1 MHz
 Gyeonggi (HLTM/relay) : FM 97.7 MHz
 Incheon (HLNE/relay) : FM 90.9 MHz

DMB Radio 
 Seoul (HLKA-TDMB): CH 12B
 Chuncheon : CH 13B
 Daejeon/Cheongju : CH 11B
 Gwangju/Jeonju: CH 12B/CH 8B/CH 7B
 Daegu : CH 7B/CH 9B
 Busan/Ulsan : CH 12B/CH 9B
 Jeju : CH 13B/CH 8B

KBS Hanminjok Radio 
 Nationwide (HLSR) : AM 972 kHz, AM 1170 kHz, SW 6.015 MHz

KBS World Radio 
 Various Shortwave frequencies that can be found on the KBS Website.

Educational Broadcasting System

Key transmitters

 Seoul/Incheon/Gyeonggi HLQL-FM 104.5 MHz (Gwanaksan 10 kW)
 Gangneung 104.9 MHz (Goebangsan)
 Gwangju 105.3 MHz (Mudeungsan)
 Daegu 105.1 MHz (Palgongsan, 5 kW)
 Pohang 106.7 MHz (Johangsan, 3 kW)
 Andong 107.7 MHz (Ilwolsan, 3 kW)
 Daejeon 105.7 MHz (Gyeryongsan) : mainly Daejeon area / 107.9 MHz (Sikjangsan) : available all over the Chungnam area and some parts of Chungbuk area
 Mokpo 104.1 / 106.7 MHz (Daedunsan)
 Busan 107.7 MHz (Hwangnyeongsan)
 Suncheon 106.3 MHz
 Ulsan 105.9 MHz (Muryongsan)
 Wonju 104.9 MHz (Baegunsan, 3 kW)
 Jeonju 106.9 MHz (Moaksan, 5 kW)
 Jinju 105.5 MHz (Mangjinsan)
 Jeju (northern part of Jeju island) 107.3 MHz (Ara)
 Seoguipo (southern part of Jeju island) 104.9 MHz
 Changwon 104.3 MHz (Bulmosan)
 Cheongju 105.1 MHz
 Chungju 104.1 MHz (Gayeopsan)
 Chuncheon 106.5 MHz (Hwaaksan)

Low-power relay stations

Paju relay 107.1 MHz (northern Gyeonggi)
Ongjin relay 105.9 MHz (remote Incheon)
Okgye 106.5 MHz
Taebaek relay 107.1 MHz
Sokcho relay 107.7 MHz
Yangyang relay 105.9 MHz
Gokseong relay 104.1 MHz
Jangheung relay 106.9 MHz
Yeonggwang relay 106.5 MHz
Seosan relay 102.3 MHz
Boryeong relay 104.7 MHz
Gumi relay 107.1 MHz
Hoengseong relay 107.5 MHz
Geochang relay 104.7 MHz
Boeun relay 107.3 MHz
Yeongdong relay 104.3 MHz
Danyang relay 106.3 MHz
Yanggu relay 104.5 MHz (near DMZ area)

Munhwa Broadcasting Corporation

Seoul-MBC/HLKV 
[Seoul Munhwa Broadcasting Corporation]
MBC Radio/HLKV-SFM : FM 95.9 MHz
MBC FM4U/HLKV-FM : FM 91.9 MHz
Channel M/HLKV-TDMB : DMB CH 12A

Chuncheon-MBC/HLAN 
[Chuncheon Munhwa Broadcasting Corporation]
 Chuncheon-MBC Radio : FM 92.3 / 88.9 MHz
 Chuncheon-MBC FM4U : FM 94.5 / 98.3 MHz

Wonju-MBC/HLSB 
[Wonju Munhwa Broadcasting Corporation]
 Wonju-MBC Radio : FM 92.7, 102.5 MHz
 Wonju-MBC FM4U : FM 98.9 MHz

MBC-Gangwon-Yeongdong 
[MBC Gangwon Yeongdon Corporation]
Gangneung (Headquarters)/HLAF
 MBC-Gangwon-Yeongdong Radio : FM 96.3, 100.7, 99.7 MHz, AM 1287 kHz
 MBC-Gangwon-Yeongdong FM4U : FM 94.3, 90.7, 96.9 MHz

Samcheok (Branch)/HLAQ
 MBC-Gangwon-Yeongdong Radio : FM 93.1, 101.5 MHz
 MBC-Gangwon-Yeongdong : FM 99.9, 98.1 MHz

Daejeon-MBC/HLCQ 
[Daejeon Munhwa Broadcasting Corporation]
 Daejeon-MBC Radio : FM 92.5, 91.3, 93.7 MHz
 Daejeon-MBC FM4U : FM 97.5 MHz

MBC-Chungbuk 
[MBC Chungbuk Corporation]
Chungju (Headquarters)/HLAO
 MBC-Chungbuk Radio Chungju : FM 96.1, 94.7, 94.1 MHz
 MBC-Chungbuk FM4U Chungju : FM 88.7 MHz

Cheongju (Branch)/HLAX
 MBC-Chungbuk Radio Cheongju : FM 107.1, 96.3 MHz
 MBC-Chungbuk FM4U Cheongju : FM 99.7 MHz

Jeonju-MBC/HLCX 
[Jeonju Munhwa Broadcasting Corporation]
 Jeonju-MBC Radio : FM 94.3, 101.7 MHz, AM 855 kHz
 Jeonju-MBC FM4U : FM 99.1 MHz

Gwangju-MBC/HLCN 
[Gwangju Munhwa Broadcasting Corporation]
 Gwangju-MBC Radio : FM 93.9, 101.9 MHz, AM 819 kHz
 Gwangju-MBC FM4U : FM 91.5 MHz

Mokpo-MBC/HLAM 
[Mokpo Munhwa Broadcasting Corporation]
 Mokpo-MBC Radio : FM 89.1 MHz
 Mokpo-MBC FM4U : FM 102.3 MHz

Yeosu-MBC/HLAT 
[Yeosu Munhwa Broadcasting Corporation]
 Yeosu-MBC Radio : FM 100.3, 107.1, 101.3 MHz
 Yeosu-MBC FM4U : FM 98.3 MHz

Daegu-MBC/HLCT 
[Daegu Munhwa Broadcasting Corporation]
 Daegu-MBC Radio : FM 96.5, 98.7, 100.3 MHz
 Daegu-MBC FM4U : FM 95.3 MHz

Andong-MBC/HLAW 
[Andong Munhwa Broadcasting Corporation]
 Andong-MBC Radio : FM 100.1 MHz
 Andong-MBC FM4U : FM 91.3 MHz

Pohang-MBC/HLAV 
[Pohang Munhwa Broadcasting Corporation]
 Pohnag-MBC Radio : FM 100.7, 102.7, 98.5 MHz
 Pohang-MBC FM4U : FM 97.9, 94.9, 90.9 MHz

Busan-MBC/HLKU 
[Busan Munhwa Broadcasting Corporation]
 Busan-MBC Radio : FM 95.9, 106.5 MHz
 Busan-MBC FM4U : FM 88.9 MHz

Ulsan-MBC/HLAU 
[Ulsan Munhwa Broadcasting Corporation]
 Ulsan-MBC Radio : FM 97.5 MHz
 Ulsan-MBC FM4U : FM 98.7 MHz

MBC-Gyeongnam 
[MBC Gyeongnam Corporation]
Jinju (Headquarters)/HLAK
 MBC-Gyeongnam Radio Jinju : FM 91.1, 93.5 MHz
 MBC-Gyeongnam FM4U Jinju : FM 97.7, 96.1 MHz

Changwon (Branch)/HLAP
 MBC-Gyeongnam Radio Changwon : FM 98.9, 96.7 MHz
 MBC-Gyeongnam FM4U Changwon : FM 100.5 MHz

Jeju-MBC/HLAJ 
[Jeju Munhwa Broadcasting Corporation]
 Jeju-MBC Radio : FM 97.9, 97.1, 106.5 MHz
 Jeju-MBC FM4U : FM 90.1, 102.9, 102.5 MHz

Seoul Broadcasting System

SBS Radio/HLSQ
[Seoul Broadcasting System Radio Networks Ltd.]
SBS Love FM/HLSQ-SFM : FM 103.5, 98.3 MHz
SBS Power FM/HLSQ-FM : FM 107.7, 100.3 MHz
SBS V-Radio/HLSQ-TDMB : DMB CH 12C

G1 Broadcasting Company/HLCG
[G1 Broadcasting Company]
 G1 Fresh-FM : FM 105.1, 103.1, 106.1, 99.3, 88.3, 101.3 MHz

TJB/HLDF
[Taejon Broadcasting Corporation]
 TJB POWER FM : FM 95.5, 95.7, 96.1, 96.5 MHz

CJB/HLDR
[Choengju Broadcasting Corporation]
 CJB JOY FM : FM 101.5, 97.9, 102.7 MHz

JTV/HLDQ
[Jeonju Television]
 JTV MAGIC FM : FM 90.1 MHz

kbc/HLDH
[Kwangju Broadcasting Corporation]
 kbc MY FM : FM 101.1, 96.7, 104.3, 90.7 MHz

TBC/HLDE
[Taegu Broadcasting Corporation]
 TBC DREAM FM : FM 99.3, 106.5, 99.7 MHz

KNN/HLDG
[Korea New Network]
 KNN Love FM : FM 105.7, 88.5, 89.3, 90.9, 98.7 MHz
 KNN Power FM : FM 99.9, 96.3, 102.5, 105.5, 106.7 MHz

ubc/HLDP
[Ulsan Broadcasting Corporation]
 ubc GREEN FM : FM 92.3 MHz

JIBS, HLQC-FM and HLKJ-FM
[Jeju International Broadcasting System]
 JIBS NEW-POWER FM : FM 101.5, 98.5, 97.5 MHz

Christian Broadcasting System

Seoul CBS
CBS AM (HLKY/HLKY-SFM) : FM 98.1, 100.7 MHz, AM 837 kHz
CBS FM (HLKY-FM) : FM 93.9 MHz

Provincial CBS FM stations
Busan CBS FM (HLKP-FM) : FM 102.1, 105.3 MHz
Daegu CBS FM (HLKT-FM) : FM 97.1 MHz
Gwangju CBS FM (HLEM-FM) : FM 98.1 MHz

Provincial CBS AM/SFM Stations
Gangwon CBS SFM (HLDC-FM) : FM 93.7, 94.9 MHz
Gangwon yeongdong CBS SFM (HLCO-FM) : FM 91.5, 91.9, 91.9 MHz
Daejeon CBS SFM (HLDX-SFM) : FM 91.7, 99.3 MHz
Cheongju CBS SFM (HLAC-FM) : FM 91.5, 99.3 MHz
Daegu CBS AM (HLKT-SFM) : FM 103.1, 92.3 MHz
Pohang CBS SFM (HLCB-FM) : FM 91.5 MHz
Busan CBS AM (HLKP-SFM) : FM 102.9 MHz
Ulsan CBS SFM (HLCD-FM) : FM 100.3 MHz
Gyeongnam CBS SFM (HLCC-FM) : FM 106.9, 94.1 MHz
Jeonbuk CBS AM (HLCM-SFM) : FM 103.7, 90.7, 96.3 MHz
Gwangju CBS AM (HLCL-SFM) : FM 103.1 MHz
Jeonnam CBS SFM (HLCL-FM) : FM 102.1, 89.5 MHz
Jeju CBS SFM (HLKO-FM) : FM 93.3, 90.9 MHz

Far East Broadcasting Company
Seoul FEBC (HLKX/HLKX-SFM) : AM 1188 kHz, FM 106.9 MHz
Youngdong FEBC (HLDY-FM) : FM 90.1, 102.9, 100.9 MHz
Daejeon FEBC (HLAD-FM) : FM 93.3 MHz
Gwangju FEBC (HLED-FM) : FM 93.1 MHz
Mokpo FEBC (HLKW-FM) : FM 100.5 MHz
Jeonmandongbu FEBC (HLEI-FM) : FM 97.5, 92.9 MHz
Daegu FEBC (HLKK-FM) : FM 91.9, 105.9 MHz
Pohang FEBC (HLDZ-FM) : FM 90.3 MHz
Busan FEBC (HLQQ-FM) : FM 93.3, 96.7 MHz
Ulasn FEBC (HLQR-FM) : FM 107.3 MHz
Changwon FEBC (HLDD-FM) : FM 98.1, 92.5 MHz
Jeju FEBC (HLAZ/HLAZ-SFM) : AM 1566 kHz, FM 104.7, 101.1 MHz
Jeonbuk FEBC (HLEN-FM) : FM 91.1 MHz

Other stations

Seoul/Incheon/Gyeonggi
WBS FM (HLQK) : FM 89.7 MHz
90.7 iFM (HLDO) : FM 90.7 MHz
YTN News FM (HLQV) : FM 94.5 MHz
TBS FM (HLST) : FM 95.1 MHz
Gugak FM (HLQA) : FM 99.1 MHz
101.3 TBS eFM (HLSW) : FM 101.3 MHz (English-language radio station)
BBS FM (HLSG) : FM 101.9, 88.1 MHz
AFN Korea : FM 102.7 MHz, AM 1530 kHz
CPBC FM (HLQP) : FM 105.3 MHz
KFN FM (HLSF/Gukpang FM) : FM 96.7 MHz (Military Radio Broadcast)
TBN FM (HLSU) : FM 100.5, 105.5 MHz
Seongnam FM : FM 90.7 MHz (Low Power Station, Gyeonggi)
Gwanak FM : FM 100.3 MHz (Low Power Station, Gwanak-gu Area)
Mapo FM : FM 100.7 MHz (Low Power Station, Mapo-gu Area)

Busan
HLDW-FM : FM 101.1, 94.3, 101.5 MHz
HLQJ-FM : FM 104.9 MHz
HLDA-FM : FM 89.9, 89.5, 88.1 MHz
HLDN-FM : FM 94.9 MHz
Busan e-FM (HLSX) : FM 90.5 MHz (English-language radio station)

Jeonbuk
HLDV-FM : FM 97.9 MHz
HLCM-FM : FM 102.5 106.1 MHz

Ulsan
HLQU-FM : FM 88.3 MHz
HLCV-FM : FM 104.1 MHz

Gongju
Geumgang FM : FM 104.9 MHz (Low Power Station)
HLDT-FM : FM 102.9 MHz

Chuncheon
HLQM-FM : FM 100.1, 93.5, 97.1, 104.3 MHz

Gangwon
HLSV-FM : FM 105.9, 103.7, 105.5, 95.1, 95.3, 89.3 MHz

Cheongju
HLDJ-FM : FM 96.7, 106.7 MHz

Chungbuk
HLEO-FM : FM 103.3, 93.5 MHz

Gyeongnam
HLEE-FM : FM 95.5, 100.1 MHz

Daejeon
HLQO-FM : FM 106.3 MHz
HLDT-FM : FM 102.9, 103.9 MHz
HLEK-FM : FM 90.5, 101.7, 99.3 MHz

Daeɡu
HLDK-FM : FM 93.1, 100.5, 100.7, 96.9 MHz
HLCS-FM : FM 98.3 MHz
HLDI-FM : FM 94.5, 97.7, 105.5 MHz
SCN FM : FM 89.1 MHz (Low Power Station)
HLDU-FM : FM 103.9, 95.9 MHz

Gyeongbuk
HLEF-FM : FM 103.5, 103.7 MHz

Gwangju
HLDL-FM : FM 99.9, 99.5 MHz
HLQN-FM : FM 107.9 MHz
HLDB-FM : FM 89.7, 105.7, 105.1 MHz
CBN Radio : FM 88.9 MHz (Low Power Station)
GFN (HLSY-FM): FM 98.7, 93.7 MHz (English-language radio station)
HLDM-FM : FM 97.3, 103.5 MHz
HLEG : FM 99.3 MHz

Yeongju
Yeongju Community radio : FM 89.1 MHz (Low Power Station)

Jeju
Arirang Radio : FM 88.7, 88.1, 101.9 MHz (English-language radio station)
HLEL-FM : FM 94.9, 100.5 MHz
HLEH-FM : FM 105.5, 105.9 MHz

Low Power Stations are stations that broadcasts at the power of between 1 and 50 watts.

South Korean Jammer (Blocking North Korean broadcasts) 
Medium Wave:
657 kHz, Goyang and Hwaseong area
810 kHz, Hwaseong area
819 kHz, Goyang and Hwaseong area
855 kHz, Goyang and Hwaseong area

FM
89.4 MHz, Seoul and Cheonan Area
92.5 MHz, Seoul Area
92.8 MHz, Seoul Area
93.6 MHz, Seoul and Cheonan Area
97.0 MHz, Seoul and Cheonan Area
97.8 MHz, Seoul and Cheonan Area
102.3 MHz, Incheon Gangwha Area
103.7 MHz, Seoul Area

Defunct radio stations
Tongyang Broadcasting Corporation : FM 89.1 MHz, AM 639 kHz and local stations. (In 1980 the station was Forced merged to KBS Radio the result of this Seoul TBC Radio was split into two and became KBS 2FM and KBS Radio 3 and Provincial TBC Radio stations became the KBS Local FM network that retransmits 1FM and 2FM from 1980 until 2001 and 1FM full time from 2001 onwards.)
Donga Broadcasting System : AM 792 kHz (In 1980 the station was Forced merged to KBS Radio and became KBS Radio Seoul. KBS Radio Seoul closed in 1989. Frequency now owned by SBS and became SBS Love FM.)
Jeonil Broadcasting Corp. : AM 1224 kHz×
Seohae Broadcasting Corp. : AM 675 kHz× (Frequency now assigned to KBS Radio 3)
Hanguk FM : FM 89.7 MHz*
Naju Bangsong : FM 96.1 MHz
*Station was closed due to a threat of forced merger to KBS in 1980.

See also

Media of South Korea
List of radio stations in North Korea
Radio jamming in Korea

References
Korean Wikipedia

External links
KBS Radio
MBC Radio
SBS Radio
Tunein South Korean Live Radio List

South Korea